Peter Anthony Johnston (born 26 April 1959) is a former Australian rules footballer, who played for the Fitzroy Football Club in the Victorian Football League (VFL).

References

External links

1959 births
Living people
Fitzroy Football Club players
Australian players of Australian rules football